Gilbert Ravelle Gardner, II (born May 9, 1982 in Angleton, Texas) is a former American football linebacker. He was drafted by the Indianapolis Colts in the third round of the 2004 NFL Draft. He played college football at Purdue.

Gardner earned a Super Bowl ring with the Colts in Super Bowl XLI over the Chicago Bears. He also played for the Tennessee Titans, the Detroit Lions and the Bears.

Early years
Gardner attended Angleton High School in Angleton, Texas and was a letterman in football, baseball, and track. In football, he was a three-time All-District selection and a three-time All-County selection. Gilbert Gardner graduated from Angleton High School in 2000. He and his wife, Emily, have a son named Gilbert Ravelle Gardner III. Gilbert has returned to his roots and is a coach at his hometown Angleton High School.

College career
At Purdue University, he started 31 of 46 games, recording 215 tackles with 3.5 sacks, 23 stops for losses, seven fumble recoveries, three forced fumbles, 11 pass deflections and three interceptions.

Professional career

Indianapolis Colts
He was drafted by the Colts in the 3rd round (69th overall) of the 2004 NFL Draft. He played for the Indianapolis Colts as a backup during the 2004 and 2005 seasons, eventually rising to starting LB by 2006. His 2006 season is remembered negatively by fans, as he was a key cog of the worst run defense in the league, until he was benched late in the season in favor of veteran LB Rob Morris. Gardner was released from the Indianapolis Colts on May 8, 2007.

Tennessee Titans
He was claimed off waivers by the Titans on May 9, 2007 and played one season with the team before becoming a free agent in 2008.

Detroit Lions
Gardner was signed by the Detroit Lions on March 25, 2008. During the first seven weeks of the season, Gardner appeared in two games for the Lions in a reserve role and recorded no tackles. He was placed on injured reserve on October 25 after the team signed linebacker Anthony Cannon. Gardner was released on November 5.

Chicago Bears
Gardner was signed by the Chicago Bears on December 12, 2008 after running back Garrett Wolfe was placed on injured reserve. He was released the following offseason on February 13, 2009.

External links
Chicago Bears bio
Detroit Lions bio
Indianapolis Colts bio

Tennessee Titans bio

1982 births
Living people
People from Angleton, Texas
Players of American football from Texas
American football linebackers
Angleton High School alumni
Purdue Boilermakers football players
Indianapolis Colts players
Tennessee Titans players
Detroit Lions players
Chicago Bears players